David Friedman (born June 10, 1973) is a former American child actor of the 1980s.

Friedman is known for his role as Jason Carter in the Michael Landon TV series Little House on the Prairie. He retired from Hollywood at the age of 12, went to college in the San Diego area and eventually became a marketing consultant.

Filmography

External links

 Young Artist Awards

1973 births
Living people
American male film actors
American male television actors
American male child actors
People from Greater Los Angeles
Male actors from California